André Trillard (born 24 October 1947) is a member of the Senate of France, representing the Loire-Atlantique department.  He is a member of the Union for a Popular Movement.

References
Page on the Senate website

1947 births
Living people
Union for a Popular Movement politicians
French Senators of the Fifth Republic
Senators of Loire-Atlantique
Recipients of the Decoration for Services to the Republic of Austria